Hylastinus is a genus of crenulate bark beetles in the family Curculionidae. There are about 11 described species in Hylastinus.

Species
These 11 species belong to the genus Hylastinus:
 Hylastinus achillei Reitter, 1894a
 Hylastinus croaticus Fuchs, 1912
 Hylastinus eichhoffi Schedl (Eggers in), 1960b
 Hylastinus elongatus Schedl (Eggers in), 1960b
 Hylastinus fankhauseri Reitter, 1894a
 Hylastinus fiorii Eggers, 1908c
 Hylastinus granulatus Schedl (Eggers in), 1960b
 Hylastinus kroaticus Fuchs, 1912a
 Hylastinus obscurus (Marsham, 1803) (clover root borer)
 Hylastinus pilosus Eggers, 1944c
 Hylastinus tiliae Semenov Tjan-Shansky & A.P., 1902

References

Further reading

External links

 

Scolytinae
Articles created by Qbugbot